James Toher (born 1993) is an Irish hurler who plays center back for the Meath senior team. 

Born in Trim, County Meath, Toher first arrived on the inter-county scene at the age of sixteen when he first linked up with the Meath minor team before later joining the under-21 side. He made his senior debut during the 2012 league. Toher quickly became a regular member of the starting fifteen and has since won one Christy Ring Cup medal (2016). He captained his side to this historic win, lifting the cup twice in a single month after a controversial score line deemed correct by the referee was overturned by the CCC and replay awarded.

At international level Toher has played for the composite rules shinty-hurling team, captaining the U21s in 2013 and 2014 and made his senior debut in 2015.. At club level he plays with Trim.

Honours

Meath
Christy Ring Cup (1): 2016 (c)

References

1993 births
Living people
Ireland international hurlers
Trim hurlers
Meath inter-county hurlers